St Ishmael ( or Llanishmael) is a community in Carmarthenshire, Wales. The community population taken at the 2011 census was 1,370. It comprises the villages of Ferryside and Llansaint and the surrounding rural areas. The community is bordered by the communities of: Llandyfaelog; Kidwelly; Pembrey and Burry Port Town; and Llansteffan, all being in Carmarthenshire. It is named for the 6th-century Breton prince and Welsh saint Isfael.

Governance
An electoral ward in the same name existed. This ward stretched north from St. Ishmael to include Llandyfaelog, with a total population of 2,674. Local county councillor, Mair Stephens, died on 9 January 2022 after a long illness. She had been an Independent county councillor for St Ishmael since 2004, becoming deputy leader of the county council.

Following a local government boundary review (and despite opposition from St Ishmael's and Llandyfaelog's community councils), the St Ishmael ward was reconfigured, losing Llandyfaelog and combining with neighbouring Kidwelly to become 'Kidwelly and St Ishmael' from the May 2022 local elections. The new ward elects two county councillors.

References

Communities in Carmarthenshire
Carmarthen Bay